This is a list of films produced by South Korean film distribution and production company CJ Entertainment, under CJ ENM currently based in Seoul, South Korea. The company was established in 2000 and owned by CJ Group.

Films

2000s

2010s

2020s

See also 
 List of South Korean submissions for the Academy Award for Best International Feature Film

References 

Lists of films by studio
South Korean films by studio